Gritty fantasy, also known as realistic fantasy, is a subgenre of fantasy literary, artistic, and cinematic works that incorporate realistic violence and moral ambiguity, portraying a world in shades of grey, where the characters are as flawed as we are, with the same emotions and reactions.

Definition
In film and literature the adjective "gritty" means a story described in an intense and starkly realistic way; depicting the harsh reality, especially violence. Magic and fantastical creatures are often present, honoring the "fantasy" element, but the audience is not spared of themes like rape, child abuse, human trafficking etc.

Gritty fantasy has similarities to the dark fantasy, but it's not the same thing, as the dark fantasy is often about supernatural horror, while in gritty fantasy the horror comes from the realization that human violence and immorality can have no limits. Indeed, in gritty fantasy the grimy details of the world are shown, but the story may either be grimdark fantasy, dark fantasy, or high fantasy. You can’t tell just from the word “gritty”.

Literature
From a list of suggested reading on an author's website:
 Acacia (David Anthony Durham)
 A Song of Ice and Fire series (George R.R. Martin)
 Malazan Book of the Fallen series (Steven Erikson)
 Prince of Nothing series (R. Scott Bakker)
 The Black Company series (Glen Cook)
 The Broken Empire Trilogy (Mark Lawrence)
 The Chronicles of Thomas Covenant (Stephen R. Donaldson)
 The Deed of Paksenarrion (Elizabeth Moon)
 The First Law series (Joe Abercrombie)
 The Lies of Locke Lamora (Scott Lynch)
 The Night Angel Trilogy (Brent Weeks)

References

Fantasy genres